Dedham Heath, known locally as The Heath, is a hamlet in the parish of Dedham, Colchester district, in the English county of Essex.

References 
Essex A-Z (page 161)

Hamlets in Essex
Dedham, Essex